Meinir may refer to:

People
 Meinir Ffransis (born 1950), Welsh language activist
 Meinir Gwilym (born 1983), Welsh pop and folk singer

Places
 Meinir, Anglesey, Wales